French Creek is a stream in the U.S. state of Washington. It is a tributary of Snohomish River.

A share of the early settlers being of French Canadian descent caused the name to be selected.

Currently, French Creek is located within the Okanogan-Wenatchee National Forest, and is home to wilderness hiking trails.

See also
List of rivers of Washington

References

Rivers of Snohomish County, Washington
Rivers of Washington (state)